Hooker Falls is a 14-foot (3 m) waterfall located in the DuPont State Forest, southeast of Brevard, North Carolina.

Geology
Hooker Falls flows on the Little River through the DuPont State Forest.  It is one of 4 major waterfalls on the Little River in this area, the others being High Falls, Triple Falls, and Bridal Veil Falls.

History
Hooker Falls has been known for years to local residents and was named for Edmund Hooker, who operated a mill below the falls in the late 1800s.  At the time, it was named Mill Shoals Falls. The Falls was seen in the movie Last of the Mohicans as the falls the characters go over in canoes.

In the 1990s, DuPont Forest was sold to the State of North Carolina, and as DuPont has completed cleanup of various areas, those areas have been made open to the public.

Visiting Hooker Falls
Visitors may park at the Hooker Falls parking area, and then hike the short Hooker Falls Trail for roughly 1/4 mile.  There are 2 views of the falls, the first overlooking the falls from above, and a second view from across the plunge pool that lets you view the entire falls.

DuPont State Forest may also allow access to the falls to handicapped persons.  Contact the DuPont State Forest for more information.

Nearby falls
Triple Falls
High Falls
Bridal Veil Falls
Wintergreen Falls
Connestee Falls and Batson Creek Falls
Key Falls
Glen Cannon Falls
Turley Falls

External links 
North Carolina Waterfalls

References

Waterfalls of North Carolina
DuPont State Forest
Waterfalls of Transylvania County, North Carolina